Serjania pteleifolia is a species of plant in the family Sapindaceae. It is endemic to Ecuador.

References

Data deficient plants
Flora of Ecuador
pteleifolia
Taxonomy articles created by Polbot